The 2021 Styrian Grand Prix (officially known as the Michelin Grand Prix of Styria) was the tenth round of the 2021 Grand Prix motorcycle racing season. It was held at the Red Bull Ring in Spielberg on 8 August 2021.

Background
On 14 May 2021, Dorna announced the cancellation of the Finnish Grand Prix (originally scheduled as the tenth round of the championship on 11 July) for a second consecutive year due to the COVID-19 situation in the country. On the same day Dorna announced that a second race at the Red Bull Ring, named the Styrian Grand Prix, which was originally scheduled to be a one-off race in 2020, would replace it on the calendar on 8 August, one week before the Austrian Grand Prix.

Qualifying

MotoGP

Race

MotoGP
The race, scheduled to be run for 28 laps, was red-flagged on lap 3 due to an accident involving Dani Pedrosa and Lorenzo Savadori. The race was later restarted over 27 laps with the original starting grid. Savadori wasn't able to join the restart.

 Maverick Viñales started from pit lane as he stalled his bike at the start of the formation lap.

Moto2

Moto3

 Deniz Öncü started at the back of the grid as his mechanics were still working on his bike at the three minute board. His place of the grid was left vacant.
 Carlos Tatay was declared unfit to compete after Sunday warm-up session due to effects of the crash at the Italian Grand Prix. His place of the grid was left vacant.
 Niccolò Antonelli suffered a broken hand in a crash during qualifying and withdrew from the event.
 Xavier Artigas tested positive for COVID-19 on Sunday morning and withdrew from the event.

Championship standings after the race
Below are the standings for the top five riders, constructors, and teams after the round.

MotoGP

Riders' Championship standings

Constructors' Championship standings

Teams' Championship standings

Moto2

Riders' Championship standings

Constructors' Championship standings

Teams' Championship standings

Moto3

Riders' Championship standings

Constructors' Championship standings

Teams' Championship standings

Notes

References

External links

Styrian
Styrian motorcycle Grand Prix
Styrian motorcycle Grand Prix
Styrian motorcycle Grand Prix